"Catch My Disease" is a song by Australian singer Ben Lee. It was released a single from his fifth studio album, Awake Is the New Sleep (2004), on 18 January 2005 in the United States and on 25 April 2005 in Australia. The song reached number 27 in Australia and came in second place on the Triple J Hottest 100 of 2005 poll. The song obtained international recognition when it appeared in the opening scene of an episode of the American drama series Grey's Anatomy and subsequently went on to appear as a track on the drama's original soundtrack.

Awards and nominations

APRA Awards
The APRA Awards are presented annually from 1982 by the Australasian Performing Right Association (APRA). At the 2006 ceremony, Lee's winning song, "Catch My Disease", was performed by indie artist, Tecoma.

|-
|rowspan="2"| 2006 ||rowspan="2"| "Catch My Disease" (Ben Lee, McGowan Southworth) – Ben Lee || Song of the Year || 
|-
| Most Performed Australian Work ||

Track listing
Australian and New Zealand CD EP
 "Catch My Disease"
 "Float On"
 "No Right Angles" (live at KEXP, Seattle)
 "Something Borrowed, Something Blue" (live for KCRW's Morning Becomes Eclectic)
 "Catch My Disease" (demo)
 "Gamble Everything for Love" (video)

Charts

Release history

References

External links
 Lyrics

2005 singles
2005 songs
APRA Award winners
ARIA Award-winning songs
Ben Lee songs